The Bazaruto Archipelago National Park (BANP) is a protected area in the Inhambane Province of Mozambique on the Bazaruto Archipelago.
The park was proclaimed on 25 May 1971. It is off the coast of the Vilanculos and Inhassoro districts, covering a large expanse of ocean and six islands.

Location
The Bazaruto National Park was inaugurated in 1971, an archipelago of six islands off the Mozambican coast between Vilankulo and Inhassoro. The park was created to protect dugong and marine turtles, and their habitats. The islands' flora and fauna, coral reefs and marine birds were also included. The largest island is Bazaruto Island and the others are Benguerra, Margaruque, Santa Carolina (Paradise Island), Banque and Pansy Shell Island.

Ecology
The islands have a lush tropical climate and include huge dunes, forest and savannah, inland lakes and wetlands.  They host several endemic terrestrial gastropods and lizards, as well as important aggregations of Palaearctic migrant water birds. The archipelago is attractive to tourists who are interested in diving or snorkeling. The rich variety of marine life includes humpback whales, marine turtles, spinner, humpback and bottlenose dolphins, marlins and barracudas. BANP gives protection to the largest and only remaining viable population of dugongs in the Western Indian Ocean. The coral reefs are varied and said to be the least disturbed in this part of the Indian Ocean.

People

The archipelago has about 3,500 residents in seven communities. They are mostly very poor and rely on harvesting natural resources to survive. 70% of households rely on small-scale fishing to survive, while others harvest sand oysters and other marine resources, grow crops and raise livestock.
Resources may not be sufficient to maintain the population, leading to decreased catches of fish, reduced harvests and increasing poverty and food insecurity.

Conservation and Tourism
The BANP is a popular tourist destination. As of 2011, the park had five hotels promoting high-value, low-impact programs. The hotels make an important contribution to the local economy through employment and tax revenues. The World Wide Fund for Nature (WWF) has a program to help the local communities to become more sophisticated in realizing a share of revenues in return for protecting valuable ecological resources.

In December 2017, management of the park passed to African Parks.

References

African Parks (organisation)
Geography of Inhambane Province
National parks of Mozambique
Protected areas established in 1971
Tourist attractions in Inhambane Province
Southern Zanzibar–Inhambane coastal forest mosaic